Lee Young-jun (born 3 January 1991) is a South Korean ice hockey centre. Lee is currently a free agent having last played for the Daemyung Killer Whales of Asia League Ice Hockey (ALIH). He also played for Anyang Halla, High1 and Daemyung Sangmu.

He competed in the 2018 Winter Olympics for the South Korea national team.

References

External links

1991 births
Living people
HL Anyang players
Daemyung Killer Whales players
High1 players
Ice hockey players at the 2018 Winter Olympics
South Korean ice hockey centres
Olympic ice hockey players of South Korea
Competitors at the 2011 Winter Universiade